Conopsia bicolor is a moth of the family Sesiidae. It is known from Benin.

References

 
 

Sesiidae
Moths of Africa
Moths described in 1917